New People may refer to:
 New People (Cambodia), Cambodians in Democratic Kampuchea
 The New People, 1969 US TV show
 Neues Volk, Nazi newspaper
 New People (political party), Russian political party
 New People (film distributor)

See also
 New People's Party (disambiguation)